The Yula is a river in Vinogradovsky and Pinezhsky Districts of Arkhangelsk Oblast in Russia. It is a left tributary of the Pinega. The principal tributaries of the Yula are Shivrey (right), Syomras (right), Ura (right), Yongala (left), and Yuras (left).

The river basin of the Yula includes the whole eastern part of Vinogradovsky District, a big part of Pinezhsky District, and minor areas in the north-west of Verkhnetoyemsky District.

The source of the Yula is in the south-eastern part of Vinogradovsky District, close to the border with Verkhnetoyemsky District. The Yula initially flows north and enters Pinezhsky District. The only village on the Yula, the village of Pachikha, is located downstream from the confluence of the Yula with its right tributary, Pachikha. Below the Yula turns north-east. The mouth of the Yula is located south of the village of Kushkopala.

References

External links 
 

Rivers of Arkhangelsk Oblast